Joe Sherman may refer to:
Joe Sherman (baseball) (1890–1987), Major League Baseball pitcher
Joe Sherman (musician), American educator and musician
Joe Sherman (songwriter), American songwriter
Joseph Sherman (1945–2006), Jewish Canadian poet and visual arts editor